Ghalim (also Romanized as Ghalīm; also known as Boneh-ye Ghalayem and Boneh-ye Ghalīm) is a village in Miyan Ab-e Shomali Rural District, in the Central District of Shushtar County, Khuzestan Province, Iran. At the 2006 census, its population was 276, in 40 families.

References 

Populated places in Shushtar County